A list of films produced in Argentina in 1951:

External links and references
 Argentine films of 1951 at the Internet Movie Database

1951
Lists of 1951 films by country or language
Films